EASO may refer to:

People
 Molly Easo Smith (born 1958), an Indian-American professor
 San Sebastián, nicknamed la bella Easo (The beautiful Easo), a city in the Basque Autonomous Community, Spain

Other uses
 EASO Choir, a choir in San Sebastián
 European Asylum Support Office
 Expeditionary Air Support Operations Squadrons (EASO):
24th Expeditionary Air Support Operations Squadron
72d Expeditionary Air Support Operations Squadron
84th Expeditionary Air Support Operations Squadron
730th Expeditionary Air Support Operations Squadron
807th Expeditionary Air Support Operations Squadron
817th Expeditionary Air Support Operations Squadron